Maida Vale may refer to:

Maida Vale, an area of London, United Kingdom
Maida Vale Studios, a complex of seven BBC studios
Maida Vale tube station
Maida Vale (NWLR) tube station, a planned but never built underground train station
The electoral ward, Maida Vale, on Westminster City Council
Maida Vale, Western Australia, a suburb of Perth
Maida Vale (album), by Van der Graaf Generator
Maida Vale, Singapore, a road in Seletar off Piccadilly Circus
Maida Vale, Queensland (also written as Maidavale), a neighbouring in the Shire of Burdekin, Queensland, Australia